III is the third studio album by Brazilian DJ and producer Gui Boratto, released on German label Kompakt Records.

Track listing 
 Galuchat - 06:52
 Stems From Hell - 08:11
 Striker - 06:19
 The Drill - 05:08
 Flying Practice - 04:44
 Trap - 03:43
 Soledad - 05:05
 Destination Education - 04:37
 Talking Truss - 08:02
 The Third - 05:02
 This Is Not the End - 05:36

References 

2011 albums
Gui Boratto albums
Kompakt albums